Mosadi Seboko (born 7 June 1950) is the Kgosikgolo of the Balete people in Botswana. She is the first female kgosikgolo in the history of Botswana.

Early life

Her name Mosadi literally means "woman" in Setswana, and she was given the English name "Muriel". Her father, Mokgosi II, expected a boy to be his oldest child, but upon seeing his daughter, he said, "Well, it's a woman. What can I do? It's my child." In 1969, she graduated from Moeding College. Two years later, she became the department administrator at Barclay's Bank. She ended her six-year marriage with her abusive husband in 1978.

Chieftainship
Mosadi Seboko's brother was kgosikgolo from 1 June 1996 to 17 June 2001 when he died from an illness. Tumelo Seboko, an uncle of Mosadi, became acting kgosikgolo from 21 June 2001 to 7 January 2002. Mosadi's mother and sisters pushed her to become the next kgosikgolo during this time, which would break a history of solely male dikgosikgolo. At the time of the installation, she worked as a floor manager at Century Office Supplies in Broadhurst. Mosadi based her claim for bogosi on the "birthright equity"; since she was the first born, she should have precedence in becoming kgosikgolo.

Seboko had many critics because she was a woman. Her uncle Tumelo wanted Tsimane Mokgosi, a cousin of Mosadi, to become kgosikgolo instead, and other members of the kgotla tried to delay her installation by saying that she did not have the skills to lead the traditional leopard hunt or to engage in the "rainmaking" ritual, both of which were necessary to prove a kgosikgolo's legitimacy. Mosadi rebutted the arguments, saying that many of those traditions fell into disuse when Christianity came to Botswana.

Her ascension was revolutionary in that it overthrew a tradition where women were only allowed in the kgotla (village meeting) if they were invited by a male. She assumed office on 7 January 2002 and became chairperson of the Ntlo ya Dikgosi on 28 February 2002. She was crowned on 30 August 2003 and received the traditional gift of cattle, and a Toyota pickup truck, washing machine, vacuum cleaner, computer, and printer. During her coronation, she noted the changing dynamics of her tribe:

Her leadership style is unconventional compared to her male predecessors: she openly talks about her abusive husband, sexual rights for women, and the growing HIV/AIDS problem. Critics have accused her of "defending women", but Mosadi Seboko responded that she is instead "angry at women [...] for failing to exert more control over their own circumstances".

Notes

Citations

References

Botswana chiefs
Women rulers in Africa
1950 births
Living people
Botswana royalty
2002 in Botswana
Women government officials
People from Ramotswa, Botswana
21st-century Botswana women politicians
21st-century Botswana politicians